The Women competition at the 2020 World Allround Speed Skating Championships was held on 29 February and 1 March 2020.

Results

500 m
The race was started on 29 February at 11:54.

3000 m
The race was started on 29 February at 14:50.

1500 m
The race was started on 1 March at 13:00.

5000 m
The race was started on 1 March at 14:43.

Overall standings
After all events.

References

Women